NATO reporting name SS-N-23 Skiff can refer to:

 R-29RM Shtil Soviet missile (most commonly)
 R-29RMU Sineva Russian missile
 R-29 Vysota missile family